West Fargo Public Schools (WFPS) is a public school district in West Fargo, North Dakota, United States. It serves a city population of 35,708. As of the 2019–2020 school year, the district owns and operates one early childhood (kindergarten) centers, fourteen elementary schools, two middle schools, two comprehensive high schools, and one alternative high school.

In recent years, WFPS has seen record growth. The total enrollment in WFPS on the first day of school in August 2017 was 10,635, an increase of 584 students from the 2016–2017 school year. This was an increase of 497 students, or 6.18%, continuing the trend over the previous 20 years: since 1993, West Fargo Public Schools have added 3,770 students to their rolls, a 78.97% increase. This growth is requiring the construction of new schools in the district.

High schools
Sheyenne High School, serving all 9th, 10th, 11th, and 12th graders south of Interstate 94
West Fargo High School, serving all 9th, 10th, 11th, and 12th graders north of Interstate 94
West Fargo Community High School, an alternative high school for Grades 9-12
West Fargo Horace High School. Which is projected to open in the 21–22 school year

Middle schools
The following WFPS middle schools serve Grades 6–8:
Cheney Middle School
Liberty Middle School
Heritage Middle School

Elementary schools
The following WFPS elementary schools serve Grades K–5:
Aurora Elementary School
Brooks Harbor Elementary School
Deer Creek Elementary School
Eastwood Elementary School
Freedom Elementary School
Harwood Elementary School
Horace Elementary School
Independence Elementary School
L.E. Berger Elementary School
Legacy Elementary School
Osgood Elementary School
South Elementary School
Westside Elementary School
Willow Park Elementary School

Other schools
Early Childhood Center

References

External links
 

School districts in North Dakota
West Fargo, North Dakota
Education in Cass County, North Dakota
Education in Fargo–Moorhead
1876 establishments in Dakota Territory
School districts established in 1876